Eyach is a river in Baden-Württemberg, Germany. It is a left tributary of the Enz near Höfen an der Enz. Including its source river Brotenaubach, it is 18.5 km-long.

See also
List of rivers of Baden-Württemberg

References

Rivers of Baden-Württemberg
Rivers of the Black Forest
Rivers of Germany